St. Patrick's Catholic Church is a historic Roman Catholic church in Atchison, Kansas. The stone church was built in 1866 and listed on the National Register of Historic Places in 1998.

It was described as "an example of the gable front, one-story, one-room native limestone building that stands in almost every county in Kansas."

References

Gothic Revival church buildings in Kansas
Roman Catholic churches completed in 1865
19th-century Roman Catholic church buildings in the United States
Churches in the Roman Catholic Archdiocese of Kansas City in Kansas
Churches on the National Register of Historic Places in Kansas
Churches in Atchison, Kansas
National Register of Historic Places in Atchison County, Kansas